Logoplaste is a Portuguese company, producing rigid plastic containers.

Logoplaste was incorporated in 1976, pioneering in-house manufacturing in Europe, with the “Hole in the Wall” concept. ("Hole in the Wall" is industry jargon, describing the process of building the plant that manufactures a product's plastic packaging immediately next door to the plant where it is manufactured, as an addition to their building, reducing shipping costs.) Managing 63 plants today, Logoplaste is headquartered in Cascais.

History
 1976 – Start of the operations with Yoplait (yoghurts) and Nestlé (caps)
 1980 – First large scale PVC operation in mineral water (Luso)
 1989 – First PET operation with Coca-Cola in Portugal
 1993 – First thin wall operation with Unilever in Portugal
 1994 - Logoplaste goes International in Spain, with mineral waters
 1995 – Start up of the Brazilian operation with Danone
 1997 – Logoplaste enters the French market with an in-house plant operation for Coke and the first PET pre-form plant is started in Portugal, producing today over 900 million units per year
 1998 – Logoplaste arrives in the UK market, with one large plant for Procter & Gamble. A similar plant for P&G is installed in Barcelona, Spain
 2000 – A complex factory, incorporating injection and blowing of PET pre-forms is installed near London, producing Fairy Liquid bottles for the whole of Europe
 2002 - LOGOPLASTE creates ILAB (LOGOPLASTE Innovation Lab). This structure concentrates activities of development for the group. Headquarters in Cascais/Portugal
 2002 – Start up of the manufacturing of aseptic packages for UHT Milk in France and large size packages for Automotive Lubricants in Brazil
 2003 – Start up of operations in Italy, with a large implant for Unilever household care products
 2004 - Start up of operations with Arla Foods, in Leeds, manufacturing bottles for one of the most modern fresh milk factory in Europe.
 2006 - Start of operations in North America with the purchase from Tetrapak of the Ottawa, Ontario, Canada blowing facility making flavoured milk and coffee additives bottles for the Neilson dairy.
 2007 - Second North American plant in operation producing edible oil bottles for Sovena USA.
 2009 - Start of operations in Vancouver and Edmonton Canada, manufacturing various HDPE milk jugs.
 2010 - Start of operations in Coleford, Wales, producing PET products for GSK
      - Creates ILAB USA. Development Branch of ILAB that will support activities of development in North America
 2011 - LOGOPLASTE signs contracts for Vietnam. LOGOPLASTE has now 61 plants worldwide.
      - Creates ILAB Brazil. Development Branch for Brazil and Latin America

External links
Logoplaste

Packaging companies of Portugal
Cascais
Manufacturing companies established in 1976
Non-renewable resource companies established in 1976